Pike Township, Ohio may refer to:

Pike Township, Brown County, Ohio
Pike Township, Clark County, Ohio
Pike Township, Coshocton County, Ohio
Pike Township, Fulton County, Ohio
Pike Township, Knox County, Ohio
Pike Township, Madison County, Ohio
Pike Township, Perry County, Ohio
Pike Township, Stark County, Ohio

See also
Pike Township (disambiguation)

Ohio township disambiguation pages